Johann Gottlieb Schaller (1734–1814) was a German zoologist and entomologist. He wrote 
Fortgesesste Beitrage zur Geschichte exotischer Papilions in Der Naturforscher 23: 49–53 in which he described many new species of butterflies.

References
Germar, E. F. 1815: [Schaller, J. G.] Magazin der Entomologie. (Herausgegeben von E. F. Germar), Halle 1 (2): pp. 193

German lepidopterists
1734 births
1814 deaths